Donuea is a genus of African corinnid sac spiders first described by Embrik Strand in 1932.

Species 
 it contains five species:

 Donuea argenticoma (Keyserling, 1877) – Madagascar
 Donuea collustrata Bosselaers & Dierick, 2010 – Madagascar
 Donuea decorsei (Simon, 1903) (type) – Madagascar
 Donuea fusca (Simon, 1896) – Mauritius
 Donuea vittigera (Simon, 1896) – Madagascar

References

Corinnidae
Araneomorphae genera
Spiders of Madagascar